Kaaps (meaning 'of the Cape'), also known as Afrikaaps, is a West Germanic African language that evolved in the Western Cape province of South Africa. Its status as a sister language of Afrikaans or a dialect of Afrikaans is unclear. Since the early 2020s there has been a significant increase in the number of works of literature published in Kaaps. Most works in Kaaps come from authors located in the Cape Flats area of Cape Town, South Africa where it is most commonly spoken. Although Kaaps is considered a growing phenomenon, it is more specifically a colloquial dialect of Afrikaans. All other distinct colloquial variations of Afrikaans, including Kaaps, are organically connected to Standard Afrikaans as a widely spoken unitary variety and interact with it.

An academic project to create the first Kaaps language dictionary was launched in 2021.

History 
In the 17th century, Kaaps developed in South Africa's Western Cape in a multilingual context through the Dutch Colonisation. In 1652 the Dutch East India Company (Vereenigde Oostindische Compagnie, VOC) set up a refreshment station on the Cape, with the main purpose to replenish the supplies of food for the ships sailing between Europe and the East. During this period, the region's population consisted of a range of people from different ethnic groups and cultures such as the indigenous Khoisan, Malays, West Africans and Madagascan people. Many of these people were enslaved by the VOC, the Dutch East India Company and opulent Netherlanders. As a form of rebellion, the people refused to speak the language of the colonists, Kaaps thus developed through Afrikaans to communicate with one another and keep their conversations private.

Identity and social status 
Just as with any language, Kaaps plays an indisputable role in an individual's culture and identity, especially in the Cape Flats. Kaaps and its speakers, consisting mostly of "coloured" individuals, are deemed as marginalised. Under apartheid, "coloureds" were considered the “forgotten nation”,  but latterly more positive identity construction centres on concepts of creolisation and "Khoisan" indigeneity.  In hegemonic discourse, only one of two perspectives is taken into account when discussing political topics such as class, race, and culture within a South African context: either that of the "over-privileged White" or that of the "underprivileged Black." Despite "coloured" and "black" individuals sharing similar oppression, inequality and poverty of the South African apartheid, the "coloured" community remains an overlooked social group.

Stigmatisation 
Kaaps is mostly spoken by the working class "coloured" community in the Cape Flats. Kaaps is considered one of the most stigmatised variations of Afrikaans; it is often associated with low status and comical. Some common labels of Kaaps include a "kombuistaal" (kitchen language) and "skollie-idioom” (gangster idiom). The dominating image and portrayal of a Cape Kaaps speaker often consists of uneducated, half-skilled, naive and unable to comprehend or fully appreciate complexities. Additionally, Kaaps is portrayed as a socially inferior “other”. Mocked by numerous jokes and linked to Gatiepie, which is equivalent to the American Blackface in pop culture. Due to this negative connotation and stigmatisation, many speakers of Kaaps felt embarrassed to use it in public settings.

Dictionary 
The first Dictionary in Kaaps was published in Cape Town, South Africa in 2021. This dictionary is trilingual and contains Kaaps, Afrikaans and English. The Trilingual Dictionary of Kaaps was launched through a collective effort by academic and community stakeholders; the Centre for Multilingualism and Diversities research at the University of the Western Cape in partnership with an NGO Heal the Hood Project. This project was funded by the Center for Race, Ethnicity and Language at Stanford University, along with Western Cape Department of Cultural Affairs and Sport. The Trilingual Dictionary of Kaaps has four goals: to increase awareness and knowledge on the history and roots of Kaaps, to contribute to debates around unifying the writing systems of Kaaps, to document the use of Kaaps on different platforms and lastly, to describe the lived linguistic experiences of Kaaps speakers.

Today Kaaps is a marginalized language as it was perceived as a colloquial version of standard Afrikaans during the Apartheid era in South Africa, a perception that persists in democratic South Africa. Afrikaans was appropriated by white colonialists and standard, Afrikaans was established and developed as a form of resistance against hegemonic English. Furthermore, it was developed to create a collective racial identity of ordinary "white" Afrikaner people thereby separating them from the working-class, Kaaps-speaking "coloured" community. Kaaps is viewed as a subpar, impure or mixed language; consisting of mainly Afrikaans and English languages thrown together. This influenced how the social identities of "coloured" people are viewed, implying that "Black" and "White" identities are pure and bounded while "Coloured" identities were not. The speakers of Kaaps are often linked to a low social-order, comicality, stupidity and a despised language variety.

References 

Kaaps
Analytic languages
Languages of South Africa
Low Franconian languages
Stress-timed languages
Subject–object–verb languages
Verb-second languages